The Combined Force Space Component Command (CFSCC) is a U.S.-led multinational subordinate command of United States Space Command. It is responsible for tactical control of American and multinational space forces. The CFSCC's mission is to "plan, integrate, conduct, and assess global space operations in order to deliver combat relevant space capabilities to Combatant Commanders, Coalition partners, the Joint Force, and the Nation." It was established on 29 August 2019.

The United States Space Force's Space Operations Command West serves as the headquarters and staff for the Combined Force Space Component Command.

Structure
The Combined Force Space Component Command's includes four centers:
 Combined Space Operations Center (CSpOC), Vandenberg Space Force Base, California
 Missile Warning Center (MWC), Cheyenne Mountain Space Force Station, Colorado
 Joint Overhead Persistent Infrared Center (JOPC), Buckley Space Force Base, Colorado
 Joint Navigation Warfare Center (JNWC), Kirtland Air Force Base, New Mexico

History
The Combined Force Space Component Command was established immediately after the establishment of United States Space Command on August 29, 2019. In addition to having tactical control of Space Force, Army, Navy, and multinational forces, the CFSCC also plans and executes space operations. The CFSCC both executes space operations and integrates space effects and support within the existing combatant commands. The CFSCC also provides support to, and receives support from, Coalition operations centers including the Australian Space Operations Centre, part of Headquarters Joint Operations Command, Canadian Space Operations Centre, and United Kingdom Space Operations Centre.

In addition the CFSCC commands and controls assigned multinational forces in support of Operation Olympic Defender. Olympic Defender is aimed at "strengthening allies’ abilities to deter hostile actions by rivals." British Defense Minister Penny Mordaunt told delegates to a July 2019 conference that "over the next 18 months.. Britain will send eight personnel" to the CFSCC to help "“strengthen deterrence against hostile actors in space." Olympic Defender, dating to 2013, "coordinate[s] allies’ efforts to protect key satellites."

The CFSCC specifically commands space domain awareness, space electronic warfare, satellite communications, missile warning, nuclear detonation detection, environmental monitoring, military intelligence, surveillance, and reconnaissance, navigation warfare, command and control, and positioning, navigation, and timing.

A ceremony recognizing the establishment of the CFSCC occurred on October 1, 2019 at Vandenberg AFB.

Listed featured units on the CFSCC's webpage include the Combined Space Operations Center/Space Delta 5; the Commercial Integration Cell (CIC); the three other operations centers listed above; the U.S. Army 1st Space Brigade; Space Deltas 2, 3, 4, and 8; and the U.S. Army Satellite Operations Brigade (which is being transferred to the Space Force).

The Commercial Integration Cell (CIC) enables operational and technology exchange between operators at the Combined Space Operations Center and commercial satellite owner operator partners to assist real‐time and near real‐time information flow during daily routine operations and to enable rapid, informed response to critical unplanned space events or other activities.

List of commanders

See also
Space Operations Command
Joint Task Force–Space Defense

References

External links 
 Combined Force Space Component Command – official site

Multinational units and formations
Military units and formations established in 2019
Space units and formations of the United States